Jock McLellan (16 June 1908 – 29 June 1974) was a New Zealand cricket umpire. He stood in three Test matches between 1951 and 1955. In all, he umpired 15 first-class matches between 1948 and 1956, all but two of them at the Basin Reserve, Wellington.

See also
 List of Test cricket umpires

References

1908 births
1974 deaths
Place of birth missing
New Zealand Test cricket umpires